"Here in My Heart" is a song by American singer Tiffany, which was released as the second single from her third studio album New Inside. The song was written by Diane Warren and produced by Phillip Damien.

Background
"Here in My Heart" was originally dedicated to AIDS victim Ryan White; however, as an attempt to take advantage of current events, it was rededicated to the troops serving in the Gulf War and became the official USO song.

The song was released in America and Japan only as a promotional single and was therefore ineligible to chart. Despite the limited release as a single, the song has gained popularity, where the official music video has gained over 780,000 views since June 2009. Although the New Inside album was a commercial failure, the song found further popularity on the 1996 Hip-O American compilation Greatest Hits in America as well as various Japanese compilations.

Release
In America, the song was released as a one-track promotional CD single and cassette via MCA, aiming for radio station play only in 1991. For the 1990 Japanese promotional single, "Here in My Heart" was released via WEA Music K.K. as a 3inch CD with a snap-pack picture sleeve design and a promotional sticker on reverse. It featured the B-side track "Our Love" which was taken from the New Inside album. The sleeve design featured a photograph of Tiffany while having a pink background color.

Following the original release on the New Inside album and as a single, the song has also appeared on five Tiffany compilations, including the 1992 MCA Victor Japanese release Best 16, the 1996 Universal/MCA Japanese release Best One, All the Best, released via MCA in Japan and Singapore only in 1996, as well as the 1996 Hip-O release Greatest Hits which was released in America.

Promotion
A music video was created for the song - the only track from the New Inside album to have an official music video.

The song was performed live around the album's release and a professionally filmed recording of the song was live at Poland's Sopot Festival in 1990. An unofficial audience recording of the song has appeared on YouTube of Tiffany performing the song live on October 27, 2009 at Upright Cabaret. Other audience recorded videos exist on YouTube, along with a live performance of the song at the Lancaster Opera House on November 20, 2011, which featured Ivan Docenko on piano.

Critical reception
Chicago Tribune writer Jan DeKnock reviewed the album for the October 18, 1990 issue. The review stated "Throughout, Tiffany shows off a new throaty snarl to go along with her powerful pipes, which, unfortunately, sometimes must fight against too many layers of busy production. The simple charm of the album's only true ballad, Diane Warren's "Here in My Heart", shows that Tiffany's true calling may prove to be country/rock, where her strong, expressive voice (sometimes reminiscent of Brenda Lee) could be shown off to greater advantage."

On November 2, 1990, The Fresno Bee reviewed the album, stating "There's nothing here that would embarrass somebody like Cher. Tiffany even cops some of Cher's chops for "Here in My Heart" - no surprise, given that it was written by Diane Warren."

Track listing
CD Single (American release)
"Here in My Heart" – 4:09

CD Single (Japanese release)
"Here in My Heart" – 4:09
"Our Love" – 6:02

Cover versions
 In 1994, Spanish singer Paloma San Basilio released a Spanish version with the title of "Luna del Mar" in her album Al Este Del Edén.
 Also in 1994, Dutch singer René Froger released his own version of the song for his eighth studio album Walls of Emotion. It was released as a CD single via Dino Music that year as well in Europe. The single peaked at No. 12 on the Dutch Singles Chart and stayed on the chart for a total of eight weeks.
In 1997, a Diane Warren promotional six-disc set titled A Passion for Music featured four CDs of the hits of Diane Warren from 1983-1997 and two CDs of hidden classics in their original demo form. Amongst the demo versions was the original demo of "Here in My Heart", performed by Susie Benson.
 In 2000, German hard rock band Scorpions and the Berlin Philharmonic Orchestra released a version of the song on the album Moment of Glory. That version peaked at No. 91 on the UK Singles Chart.

References

Tiffany Darwish songs
1990 singles
Pop ballads
MCA Records singles
Songs written by Diane Warren
1990 songs
1990s ballads
René Froger songs
Scorpions (band) songs